EuAuto Technology Limited  was a company in Hong Kong that developed the MyCar electric automobile. The company "specializes in design, develop, manufacture and sales of environmentally friendly vehicles for global markets." Sinling Chung was the company's chief executive. On 24 May 2010, GreenTech Automotive (GTA) acquired EuAuto Technology.

Models

MyCar

The MyCar was styled by Giorgetto Giugiaro of Italdesign.  The propulsion system was engineered in co-operation with Hong Kong Polytechnic University.

References

External links

Electric vehicle manufacturers of Hong Kong